Kuven Hill is a prominent hill between Gommen Valley and Kuvsletta Flat, near the southwest end of the Kirwan Escarpment in Queen Maud Land, Antarctica. It was mapped by Norwegian cartographers from surveys and air photos by the Norwegian–British–Swedish Antarctic Expedition (1949–52) and additional air photos (1958–59), and named Kuven (the hump).

References

Hills of Queen Maud Land
Princess Martha Coast